The Gwynedd Football League was a football league at the fifth level of the Welsh football league system in north-west Wales.

The league folded in 2020 due to a reorganisation of the Welsh football league pyramid, with many teams joining the North Wales Coast West Football League.

Member clubs for the final 2019–20 season

Bangor 1876
Bethesda Athletic
Bontnewydd
Bro Goronwy 
Caergybi 
Glantraeth
Llangoed
Llannerch-y-medd
Llanystumdwy
Menai Bridge Tigers
Ogwen Tigers (folded June 2020)
Nefyn United 
Talysarn Celts
Trearddur Bay Bulls
Waunfawr

Cups
There were three active cups played for within the league. They were:

Tarian Gwynedd Safeflue Shield
Cwpan Gwynedd  (Gwynedd Cup)
Tarian Goffa Bob Owen Memorial Shield

History

Champions

 1983–84: Y Felinheli
 1984–85: Bethesda Athletic
 1985–86: No competition
 1986–87: Locomotive Llanberis
 1987–88: Nantlle Vale
 1988–89: Llangefni Town
 1989–90: Llangefni Town
 1990–91: Llanrug United
 1991–92: Nefyn United
 1992–93: Holyhead Town
 1993–94: Glantraeth
 1994–95: Porthmadog Reserves 
 1995–96: Conwy United Reserves
 1996–97: Holyhead Hotspur Reserves
 1997–98: Amlwch Town
 1998–99: Glan Conwy
 1999–2000: Bethesda Athletic
 2000–01: Y Felinheli
 2001–02: Bodedern Reserves
 2002–03: Llanrug United
 2003–04: Llanrwst United
 2004–05: Porthmadog Reserves
 2005–06: Pwllheli
 2006–07: Barmouth & Dyffryn United
 2007–08: Llanllyfni
 2008–09: Blaenau Ffestiniog Amateurs
 2009–10: Gwalchmai
 2010–11: Bro Goronwy
 2011–12: Penrhyndeudraeth
 2012–13: Trearddur Bay United
 2013–14: Llanerch-y-medd
 2014–15: Llanllyfni
 2015–16: Y Felinheli
 2016–17: Bodedern Athletic
 2017–18: Holyhead Town
 2018–19: Menai Bridge Tigers
 2019–20: Bangor 1876

Player of the Season

 1983–84: Derlwyn Hughes (Menai Bridge Tigers)
 1984–85: Osian Roberts (Bethesda Athletic)
 1985–86: No competition
 1986–87: Carl Davies (Machno United)
 1987–88: Iwan Evans (Locomotive Llanberis)
 1988–89: Emrys Jones (Llangefni Town)
 1989–90: Howard Kemp (Univ. of Bangor)
 1990–91: David Phillips (Llanrug United)
 1991–92: Dale Flemming (Holyhead Town)
 1992–93: Nigel Moore (Holyhead Town)
 1993–94: Kevin S. Hughes (Blaenau Ffestiniog Amateurs)
 1994–95: Paul Evans (Hotpoint)
 1995–96: Martin Jones (Conwy United)
 1996–97: Nigel Moore (Holyhead Hotspur)
 1997–98: Ryan Davies (Llandegfan)
 1998–99: Lee Newport (Barmouth & Dyffryn United)
 1999–2000: Cemlyn Williams (Bethesda Athletic)
 2000–01: 
 2001–02: Leighton Griffiths (Llanrwst United)
 2002–03: Lex Piper (Univ. of Bangor)
 2003–04: Michael Linnekar (Univ. of Bangor)
 2004–05: Lloyd Edwards (Porthmadog)
 2005–06: Lloyd Edwards (Pwllheli)
 2006–07: Craig Papirnyk (Barmouth & Dyffryn)
 2007–08: Chris Parry (Llanllyfni)
 2008–09: Gareth Wyn Roberts (Bodedern Athletic)
 2009–10: Jonathan Sadler (Caernarfon Wanderers)
 2010–11: 
 2011–12: Mathew Hughes (Penrhyndeudraeth)
 2012–13: Ian Williams (Trearddur Bay United)
 2013–14: 
 2014–15: 
 2015–16: 
 2016–17: 
 2017–18:

Top goalscorer

 1983–84: Billy Hughes (Y Felinheli, 22 goals)
 1984–85: Peter Kasperek (Llanfairpwll, 12 goals)
 1985–86: No competition
 1986–87: Steven Williams (Llanberis, 26 goals)
 1987–88: Hugh Jones (Nantlle Vale, 36 goals)
 1988–89: David Jones (Nefyn United, 37 goals)
 1989–90: David Jones (Nefyn United, 41 goals)
 1990–91: Richard Richards (Machno United, 35 goals)
 1991–92: David Jones (Nefyn United, 38 goals)
 1992–93: Dale Flemming (Holyhead Town, 35 goals)
 1993–94: John Hayes (Mountain Rangers, 51 goals)
 1994–95: Ian Williams (Porthmadog, 37 goals)
 1995–96: Dominic Hardy (Barmouth & Dyffryn, 39 goals)
 1996–97: Matthew Evans (Llanrwst United, 28 goals)
 1997–98: Viv Williams (Amlwch Town, 43 goals)
 1998–99: David Jones (Pwllheli, 34 goals)
 1999–2000: Daron Wyn Jones (Llangefni, 32 goals)
 2000–01: Terry Jones (Felinheli, 24 goals)
 2001–02: Alan Jones (Nefyn United, 37 goals)
 2002–03: Anthony Hughes (Beaumaris Town, 39 goals)
 2003–04: Andy Hall (Univ. of Bangor, N/A)
 2004–05: Gareth Davies (Beaumaris Town, 34 goals)
 2005–06: Peter Griffiths (Pwllheli, 31 goals)
 2006–07: Carl Ryan (Barmouth & Dyffryn, 35 goals)
 2007–08: Mathew Hughes (Porthmadog, 40 goals)
 2008–09: Jamie Whitemore (Bethel, 37 goals)
 2009–10: Andy Clarke (Beaumaris Town, 27 goals)
 2010–11: 
 2011–12: 
 2012–13: Darren Ishmael (Beaumaris Town, N/A)
 2013–14: 
 2014–15: Sion Parry (Llanystumdwy, 56 goals)
 2015–16: Sion Parry (Llanystumdwy, 42 goals)
 2016–17: Sion Parry (Llanystumdwy, 36 goals)
 2017–18: Sion Parry (Llanystumdwy, 40 goals)

References

 
Sport in Gwynedd
Wales
Sports leagues established in 1983
1983 establishments in Wales
2020 disestablishments in Wales
Sports leagues disestablished in 2020
Defunct football competitions in Wales